Mario Scaccia (26 December 1919 – 26 January 2011) was an Italian actor and author. He was a prominent figure in the Italian theatre of '900.

Biography 
Born in Rome, the son of a painter, during the Second World War Scaccia was conscripted into the army as an officer in Sicily; made prisoner by the American army, he was taken in Morocco, where he remained three years. In 1945 Scaccia returned to Rome, where he abandoned his studies in pedagogy and enrolled at the Accademia Nazionale di Arte Drammatica Silvio D'Amico, attending only the first year; in 1946 he started appearing on stage, usually as character actor. In 1961 Scaccia was co-founder, together with Valeria Moriconi, Franco Enriquez and Glauco Mauri, of the Compagnia dei Quattro ("Company of the Four") that gained critical and commercial success. At the same time Scaccia was a prolific character actor in films, TV series and radio-dramas.

Scaccia was also an author and a poet; his works include several autobiographies. He died in Rome at 91, as a result of complications for a surgical intervention.

Selected filmography 

 The Flame (1952) - Mauret
 A Slice of Life (1954) - (segment "Scena all'aperto")
 Too Bad She's Bad (1955) - Carletto, l'uomo derubato della borsa
 Lucky to Be a Woman (1956) - Un cameriere
 Il Mattatore (1960) - Il gioielliere
 The Traffic Policeman (1960) - Mayor's lawyer (uncredited)
 Femmine di lusso (1960) - Edmondo, the butler
 Revenge of the Barbarians (1960) - Onorius, Emperor of the West
 Robin Hood and the Pirates (1960) - Jonathan Brooks
 Ursus (1961)  - Kymos
 Behind Closed Doors (1961)  - Manning, l'albergatore
 Day by Day, Desperately (1961) - Orderly
 The Seventh Sword (1962) - Il Cardinale / The Cardinal
 Musketeers of the Sea (1962) - Re di Francia
 Avventura al motel (1963) - Manfredi
 The Swindlers (1963) - Lawyer (segment "Medico e fidanzata")
 Shivers in Summer (1964) - The Manager of 'Carrousel' Show
 Amore facile (1964) - Cante Bardi-Stucchi (segment "Divorzio italo-americano")
 Oltraggio al pudore (1964)
 Me, Me, Me... and the Others (1966) - Guidarino, Journalist
 A Maiden for the Prince (1966) - Cardinal Gonzaga
 We Still Kill the Old Way (1967) - Prete
 Giacomo Casanova: Childhood and Adolescence (1969) - Doctor Zambelli
 Between Miracles (1971) - Priore
 Meo Patacca (1972) - Cardinale
 Il generale dorme in piedi (1972) - Gen. Arturo Pigna
 The Adventures of Pinocchio (1972) - 1° Dottore
 La calandria (1972) - Ruffo
 Property Is No Longer a Theft (1973) - Alessandro Marzo 'Albertone'
 The Perfume of the Lady in Black (1974) - Signor Rossetti
 Le farò da padre (1974) - Don Amilcare De Loyola
 The Antichrist (1974) - Faith Healer
 The Sex Machine (1975) - Mons. Alberoni
 Eye of the Cat (1975) - Salomone Fioravanti
 Lezioni di violoncello con toccata e fuga (1976) - Leopoldo
 Soldier of Fortune (1976) - Don Pedro Gonzalo de Guadarrama
 Goodnight, Ladies and Gentlemen (1976) - Cardinal Piazza-Colonna
 Un amore targato Forlì (1976)
 Black Journal (1977) - Rosario
 Double Murder (1977) - Marino Cianciarelli
 Break Up (1978) - Il dottore
 The Word (1978, TV Mini-Series) - Agusto Monti
 Occhio, malocchio, prezzemolo e finocchio (1983) - Corinto Marchialla
 Il mistero del morca (1984)
 Juke box (1985)
 L'ultima mazurka (1986) - Reiger
 Secondo Ponzio Pilato (1987) - Tiberio
 In camera mia (1992)
 Ferdinando and Carolina (1999) - Ferdinando I Borbone (old)
 Voglio stare sotto al letto (1999) - Giò Giordani
 Gabriel (2001)

Bibliography 
 Mario Scaccia, Il Diario dell'Anima, 1969
 Mario Scaccia, Un disperato amore, 1972
 Mario Scaccia, Zio cardinale, 1974
 Mario Scaccia, Quattro mesi in platea, 1977
 Mario Scaccia, Io e il teatro, 1978
 Giovanni Giràud, Mario Scaccia, Il galantuomo per transazione, 1980
 Mario Scaccia, L'antologia rifatta, 1981
 Mario Scaccia, La verità inventata. Del mestiere dell'arte dell'attore, 1989
 Mario Scaccia, Il mio Molière, 1994
 Paolo Perrone Burali d'Arezzo, Mario Scaccia, Mario Verdone, Totò e Onorato, 1999
 Mario Scaccia, Due braccia e una lira, 2004
 Mario Scaccia, Interpretando la mia vita. Il mio teatro, i miei personaggi, la mia storia, 2009 
 Mario Scaccia, Maschere romane, 2010 
 Mario Scaccia, Per amore di una rima, 2011

References

External links 
 Official site
 

Italian male film actors
1919 births
Male actors from Rome
2011 deaths
Italian male television actors
Italian male stage actors
Italian radio personalities
Italian military personnel of World War II
Italian male poets
Accademia Nazionale di Arte Drammatica Silvio D'Amico alumni
Writers from Rome
20th-century Italian poets
20th-century Italian male writers
Italian prisoners of war
World War II prisoners of war held by the United States